John Anthony Hudson (born 26 August 1945) is an English professional golfer.

Born in Wokingham, Berkshire, he turned professional in 1964, and was a European Tour member in 1971, 1974, and 1976.

Although relatively little-known, Hudson – then 25 years old, and club professional at Hendon – achieved fame during the second round of the 1971 Martini International tournament, held at the Royal Norwich Golf Club. Teeing off, using a 4-iron, at the par-three, 195-yard 11th hole, Hudson holed his tee shot for a hole-in-one. At the next hole, the downhill 311-yard, par-four 12th, and this time using a driver, he once again holed his tee shot, for another ace. This is believed to be the only time a player has scored holes-in-one at consecutive holes in a major professional tournament. Hudson eventually finished tied for ninth place in this tournament, and earned £160, out of a total prize fund of £7,000, for his efforts.

Hudson played on the European Seniors Tour from 1995 to 2000, and is now the professional at Rivenhall Oaks Golf Centre in Witham, Essex.

Results in major championships

Note: Hudson only played in The Open Championship.

CUT = missed the half-way cut (3rd round cut in 1970 Open Championship)

References

External links

English male golfers
European Tour golfers
European Senior Tour golfers
People from Wokingham
People from Maldon District
1945 births
Living people